Human Target is the fifth studio album by Australian deathcore band Thy Art Is Murder. It was released on 26 July 2019 and is the band's first album with drummer Jesse Beahler following the departure of Lee Stanton.

Background
Andy Marsh, who wrote lyrics for several of the album's songs, named "politics, privatized prisons, environment and the planet, human organ harvesting, the pharmaceutical industry" as key topics. Marsh noted the contribution of the band's new drummer Jesse Beahler: "He gave a lot of really fresh ideas as far as how to push and pull with the verses and incorporate some groove-y elements and breakdowns. He adds this technical, Meshuggah-esque element".

Track listing

Personnel

Thy Art Is Murder
 Chris "CJ" McMahon – vocals
 Andy Marsh – lead guitar
 Sean Delander – rhythm guitar
 Kevin Butler – bass guitar
 Jesse Beahler – drums

Production
 Eliran Kantor – artwork
 Will Putney – mixing, mastering, production, engineering

Charts

References

2019 albums
Thy Art Is Murder albums
Nuclear Blast albums
Albums produced by Will Putney